Buckshutem is an unincorporated community located within Commercial Township, in Cumberland County, New Jersey, United States. The community is situated near Buckshutem Creek, nearby Laurel Lake. The name "Buckshutem" is of Native American origin; though others say that the name is derived from the creek's rapid flow of water as it empties into the brisk wake of the Maurice River, producing a cross current that causes a boat to "buck and shoot" through that section.

References

Commercial Township, New Jersey
Unincorporated communities in Cumberland County, New Jersey
Unincorporated communities in New Jersey